Deltomerus is a genus of ground beetles in the family Carabidae. There are more than 70 described species in Deltomerus.

Species
These 73 species belong to the genus Deltomerus:

 Deltomerus abdurakhmanovi Zamotajlov, 1994  (Russia)
 Deltomerus alexeevi Zamotajlov, 1992  (Russia)
 Deltomerus balachovskyi Ledoux, 1976  (Turkey)
 Deltomerus belousovi Zamotajlov, 1988  (Georgia and Russia)
 Deltomerus bogatshevi Zamotajlov, 1988  (Azerbaijan and Russia)
 Deltomerus bogossicus Zamotajlov, 1992  (Russia)
 Deltomerus boroumandi Deuve, 2011  (Iran)
 Deltomerus bosnicus Apfelbeck, 1912  (Bosnia-Herzegovina)
 Deltomerus carpathicus (L.Miller, 1868)  (Poland, Romania, Slovakia, and Ukraine)
 Deltomerus chachalgensis Zamotajlov, 1994  (Russia)
 Deltomerus circassicus Reitter, 1890  (Georgia and Russia)
 Deltomerus corax Peyerimhoff, 1922
 Deltomerus dariae Zamotajlov, 1994  (Russia)
 Deltomerus davatchii Morvan, 1970  (Iran)
 Deltomerus defanus Zamotajlov, 1988  (Russia)
 Deltomerus deliae Morvan, 1970  (Iran)
 Deltomerus depressus A.Fiori, 1896  (Italy)
 Deltomerus dinci Ledoux, 1976  (Turkey)
 Deltomerus dostali Donabauer, 2004  (Syria)
 Deltomerus dubiolus Zamotajlov, 1992  (Georgia)
 Deltomerus dubius (Chaudoir, 1846)  (Georgia)
 Deltomerus elburzensis Morvan, 1981  (Iran)
 Deltomerus elegans Chaudoir, 1872  (Georgia)
 Deltomerus elongatus (Dejean, 1831)  (Georgia and Russia)
 Deltomerus ensiger Kurnakov, 1960  (Georgia and Russia)
 Deltomerus expectatus Zamotajlov, 1992  (Georgia)
 Deltomerus fischtensis Kurnakov, 1960  (Russia)
 Deltomerus fulvipes (Motschulsky, 1839)  (Georgia)
 Deltomerus golovatchi Zamotajlov, 1992  (Russia)
 Deltomerus gusevi Belousov & Zamotajlov, 1988  (Azerbaijan)
 Deltomerus heinzi Zamotajlov, 2001  (Iran)
 Deltomerus intermedius Zamotajlov, 1992  (Russia)
 Deltomerus iristonicus Zamotajlov, 1992  (Russia)
 Deltomerus jeanneli Kurnakov, 1960  (Georgia and Russia)
 Deltomerus jelineki Zamotajlov, 2001  (Iran)
 Deltomerus kabardensis Zamotajlov, 1996  (Russia)
 Deltomerus kataevi Zamotajlov, 1988  (Russia)
 Deltomerus khnzoriani Kurnakov, 1960  (Armenia)
 Deltomerus komarovi Zamotajlov, 1988  (Russia)
 Deltomerus korrigani Morvan, 1981  (Iran)
 Deltomerus kovali Zamotajlov, 1988  (Russia)
 Deltomerus kryzhanovskii Zamotajlov, 1988  (Russia)
 Deltomerus kurnakovi Zamotajlov, 1988  (Georgia)
 Deltomerus lailensis Zamotajlov, 1994  (Georgia)
 Deltomerus leticus Zamotajlov, 1992  (Georgia)
 Deltomerus lodosi Ledoux, 1976  (Turkey)
 Deltomerus malissorum Apfelbeck, 1918  ((former) Yugoslavia and Albania)
 Deltomerus mercanensis Zamotajlov, 2001  (Turkey)
 Deltomerus mirabilis Zamotajlov, 1992  (Russia)
 Deltomerus miroshnikovi Zamotajlov, 1994  (Russia)
 Deltomerus morvani Zamotajlov, 1990  (Iran)
 Deltomerus nopcsae Csiki, 1940  ((former) Yugoslavia)
 Deltomerus osseticus Zamotajlov, 1992  (Russia)
 Deltomerus paradoxus Apfelbeck, 1908  (Albania and North Macedonia)
 Deltomerus parumpunctatus Zamotajlov, 1990  (Albania)
 Deltomerus pjatigorianus Zamotajlov, 1996  (Russia)
 Deltomerus pseudoplatynus Reitter, 1887  (Russia)
 Deltomerus punctatissimus (Fairmaire, 1859)  (Algeria and Tunisia)
 Deltomerus punctatus Heinz & Ledoux, 1987  (Turkey)
 Deltomerus raddei Putzeys, 1878  (Georgia)
 Deltomerus redoni Antoine, 1928  (Morocco)
 Deltomerus sergeii Zamotajlov, 1988  (Russia)
 Deltomerus sharovae Zamotajlov, 2001  (Turkey)
 Deltomerus sokolovi Zamotajlov, 1988  (Russia)
 Deltomerus sterbai (Rambousek, 1909)  (North Macedonia)
 Deltomerus tatricus (L.Miller, 1859)  (Poland and Slovakia)
 Deltomerus tibialis Reitter, 1887  (Georgia and Russia)
 Deltomerus triseriatus Putzeys, 1878  (Georgia)
 Deltomerus tshetshenicus Zamotajlov, 1992  (Russia)
 Deltomerus validus (Chaudoir, 1846)  (Georgia and Turkey)
 Deltomerus veldkampi Muilwijk, 2015  (Iran)
 Deltomerus weiratheri G.Müller, 1937  (Greece)
 Deltomerus werneri Reitter, 1906  (Georgia)

References

Carabidae